Space Ranger (Rick Starr) is a science fiction hero who was published by DC Comics in several of their 1950s and 1960s anthology titles. He first appeared in Showcase #15 (July 1958) and was created by writers Edmond Hamilton and Gardner Fox and artist Bob Brown. The character has notable similarities to a preceding character named David "Lucky" Starr, created by novelist Isaac Asimov in his 1952 novel David Starr, Space Ranger. After appearing in Showcase #15 and 16, the Space Ranger was given a cover-starring series in Tales of the Unexpected, starting with issue #40 and lasting until #82 (1959–64). Afterwards, he moved to Mystery in Space.

Publication history
In 1957, DC Comics editorial director Irwin Donenfeld held a meeting with editors Jack Schiff and Julius Schwartz in his office, asking them each to create a new science fiction hero: one from the present, and one from the future. Given first choice, Schiff chose to create one from the future.

After a successful tryout in Showcase #15 and 16, the Space Ranger was given a slot in Tales of the Unexpected as of issue #40 (August 1959). He moved to Mystery in Space for issues #92–99, 101, 103 (1964–65).

Fictional character biography
Set in the 22nd century, Space Ranger is really Rick Starr, a seemingly shiftless executive at his gruff, cigar-chomping father Thaddeus Starr's Allied Solar Enterprises. He took on the role of the superheroic interplanetary troubleshooter to battle space pirates, alien invaders, evil scientists and other futuristic threats both cosmic and criminal, hiding his true identity beneath a transparent blue helmet and operating out of a hidden asteroid base via his sleek super-swift scarlet spaceship the Solar King.

Possessing no powers other than his highly developed brain and brawn, the crew cut, yellow and red spacesuit-clad "Guardian of the Solar System" (later "Guardian of the Universe") armed himself with a vast variety of super-scientific gadgets like the all-purpose multi-ray pistol he wore on his weapon belt.

Space Ranger is assisted by the only two people who knew his secret, his loyal and highly efficient beautiful blonde secretary/girlfriend Myra Mason and his plucky and clever cute little pink alien sidekick Cryll, a big-eyed, trunk-snouted shapeshifter with the ability to transform into sundry super-powered extraterrestrial lifeforms who he had found frozen in suspended animation beyond the orbit of Pluto.

Space Ranger and Cryll have visited the 20th century on occasion, working with contemporary heroes such as Green Lantern Hal Jordan and the Justice League of America, and in their own time have had adventures with a red-headed 22nd century descendant of Adam Strange.

Starman
Space Ranger makes an appearance in Starman #55 (July 1999), in which Space Ranger and Ultra the Multi-Alien are riding in Space Cabbie's cab to find Starman IV's cosmic staff for the Space Museum. Each regales the other with different interpretations of Jack and Mikaal rescuing Starfire from a space pirate. Space Ranger also appeared in the background on Hardcore Station in Mystery in Space (vol. 2) #6 (April 2007).

Trinity
Space Ranger has made regular appearances in Trinity, the weekly series published by DC from 2008–2009. In an alternate reality created by the absence of Superman, Batman, and Wonder Woman, Space Ranger is a member of the League, a group of vigilantes hunted by Earth's registered superhumans.  When the League goes public during a crisis, the Space Ranger reveals himself to be J'onn J'onzz, the Martian Manhunter, in disguise.

Other versions
In the "Without You I'm Nothing" short story written by Evan Dorkin and drawn by Steven Weissman, Cryll is one of a number of ex-sidekicks living on Skid Row. They include Cryll, Zook, Bathound, Proty, Doiby Dickles and many others, regardless of actual location of activity, time-period, or whether they are deceased, retconned, etc. Cryll organizes them into a superhero team, but they are roundly defeated in their first mission by Evil Star and his Starlings.

They then reorganize as an AA-type organization to help ex-sidekicks. During a meeting of such, Space Ranger enters and asks Cryll to rejoin him. Cryll, however, feels he was abandoned and chases away Space Ranger. During the night, Cryll has second thoughts about what he had done, and leaves before dawn to rejoin Space Ranger, to the consternation of the others. The oddities in this and several other offbeat stories are "explained" by crediting them to the pen of Bizarro.

Starr also appears in DC's 2013 Threshold comic by Keith Giffen.

In other media
Space Ranger makes a non-speaking cameo appearance in the Batman: The Brave and the Bold episode "The Siege of Starro!".

References

External links
 Space Ranger at the DC Index 
 Space Ranger at Mike's Amazing World of Comics

Characters created by Bob Brown
Characters created by Edmond Hamilton
Characters created by Gardner Fox
Comics characters introduced in 1958
DC Comics scientists
DC Comics superheroes
Fictional space pilots
Fictional detectives
Fictional people from the 22nd-century
Comics set in the 22nd century